Eid Ismail Baroot is an Emirati football manager.

References

Year of birth missing (living people)
Living people
Emirati football managers
Al-Nasr SC (Dubai) managers
Al-Wasl F.C. managers
Emirates Club managers
Fujairah FC managers
UAE Pro League managers